Olaka Nwogu (born 26 January 1965) is a Nigerian Business Man, Civil Servant and Politician who was a member of the House of Representatives from 1999 until 2011 for People's Democratic Party. He represented the constituency of Tai–Eleme–Oyigbo. Prior to being elected to the House, he served as Mayor (chairman) of Eleme local government area in Rivers State. In March 2015, he contested for the seat of Senator in the National Assembly and won by 408,353 votes, defeating incumbent Sen. Magnus Abe of the All Progressives Congress., but later lost in the tribunal.

In addition to his political career, Nwogu has also ventured into business. He is currently the Chairman and CEO of Landmark Hotel in D-line and Hinterland Construction Company in Eleme.

Education
Nwogu graduated with a bachelor's degree in Marketing from the University of Port Harcourt and later procured a master's degree in Business Administration from the institution.

See also
List of people from Rivers State

References

1965 births
Living people
Members of the House of Representatives (Nigeria) from Rivers State
University of Port Harcourt alumni
Rivers State Peoples Democratic Party politicians
Rivers State civil servants
Mayors of places in Rivers State
Nigerian hoteliers
Members of the Senate (Nigeria) from Rivers State
People from Eleme (local government area)